Tiruchopuram Mangalapureeswarar Temple (திருச்சோபுரம் மங்களபுரீசுவரர் கோயில்)is a Hindu temple located at Tiruchopuram in Cuddalore district, Tamil Nadu, India. The presiding deity is Shiva. He is called as Mangalapureeswarar. His consort is known as Thyagavalliammai.

Significance 
It is one of the shrines of the 275 Paadal Petra Sthalams – Shiva Sthalams glorified in the early medieval Tevaram poems by Tamil Saivite Nayanar Sambandar.

References 

Shiva temples in Cuddalore district
Padal Petra Stalam